Angelo Ephrikian (20 October 1913 – 30 October 1982) was an Italian musicologist and violinist of Armenian descent. His daughter, Laura Ephrikian, is an actress.

Angelo Ephrikian was born in Treviso, Italy.  He learned the violin from 1919, with Luigi Ferro. However, after he attended law school he immediately began working in the legal field. Angelo Ephrikian then gave up his legal career in order to join the resistance movement against Italian fascism by joining partisan forces. However, after World War II, he immediately became a musical conductor. Ephrikian was a pioneer of early Italian music. Ephrikian took a very active part in the rediscovery of the works of Vivaldi. Ephrikian directed the first contemporary opera of Vivaldi's Fida Ninfa in 1958. Angelo Ephrikian died in Rome in 1982.

He founded the independent Arcophon record label in 1960, recorded the complete works of Gesualdo with the Quintetto Vocale Italiano by 1965. This was reissued by Newton Classics on 6 CDs in 2012.

Selected discography
 Boccherini: La Clementina
 Mozart: Eine Kleine Nachtmusik 
 Monteverdi: Messa a 4 Voci
 Benedetto Marcello: Sinfonias I Solisti di Milano
 Alessandro Scarlatti: Concerti Grossi 1-12 I Solisti di Milano
 Carissimi: Dives Malus
 Jacopo Peri: Euridice. Recording: I Solisti di Milano, 1966, Arcophon Am 661/2.

References

1913 births
1982 deaths
Italian male conductors (music)
20th-century Armenian musicians
Armenian composers
Armenian classical violinists
Italian classical violinists
Male classical violinists
20th-century Italian conductors (music)
20th-century classical violinists
20th-century composers
Italian people of Armenian descent
20th-century Italian musicologists
20th-century Italian male musicians